Sadguru Riteshwar Ji Maharaj is an Indian spiritual leader, motivational speaker and author.

Sadguru has spoken at cultural festivals such as the Radha Madhav Mahotsav and Guru Poornima Mahotsav held annually across various countries including India, Nepal, Scotland, South Africa, Australia, and Canada.

Sadguru established Shri Anandam Dham as an international educational non-profit organization in Vrindavan, Uttar Pradesh. Branches of the organization operate in the capital cities of each state in India. The organization runs an environmentalist 'Save water, Save tree, Save future' campaign in India. The organization also runs numerous youth programs tackling drug and alcohol addiction in India.

Sadguru also runs Ladli Prasadham, a free food centre, in Vrindavan, Uttar Pradesh.

Early life and education
Sadguru was born on 5 January 1973 in Gorakhpur, Uttar Pradesh to a Brahmin family. Sadguru's parents are Shri Yut Vijay Narayan and Shrimati Manju Devi. His parents were teachers in Bihar. Sadguru holds a Master's degree in geology and a degree in Sanskrit.

Bibliography
Mann ka Beauty Parlor, 192 pages, publisher: Bluerose Publishers, 2022, ISBN 9356111774

Awards
Bharat Gaurav Award in 2021
"Best Spiritual Leader" by Afternoon Voice and Government of Maharashtra

Read More
Sri Riteshwar Ji Maharaj's thoughts on Hijab
What you get in life is enough
Special conversation with Riteshwar Maharaj, the Guru of CM Bhupesh Baghel

References

Hindu religious leaders
Hindu spiritual teachers
21st-century Hindu religious leaders